Westerwald-Obereichsfeld is a Verwaltungsgemeinschaft ("collective municipality") in the district Eichsfeld, in Thuringia, Germany. The seat of the Verwaltungsgemeinschaft is in Küllstedt.

The Verwaltungsgemeinschaft Westerwald-Obereichsfeld consists of the following municipalities:

 Büttstedt 
 Effelder 
 Großbartloff 
 Küllstedt 
 Wachstedt

References

Verwaltungsgemeinschaften in Thuringia